Toast Records is an independent record label based in Turin, Italy.

Company history
Toast Records is a recording company founded in 1985 by producer Giulio Tedeschi and operated by Italian Rock. It all started in 1979 in a very “underground” style. The city of Turin saw and witnessed the birth of Meccano Records. The initial idea was to promote the Righeira project. In spring 1985, out of Meccano Records, sprang Toast sas soon to become Toast Records a project that would make history in the Italian independent musical scene. First title to be produced (summer 1985): "Trasparenze e suoni" by No Strange.

Partial list albums released

Vinyl

CDs

External links
 Official website
 Official MySpace

References 
Interview  from Musicalnews

See also
 List of record labels

Record labels established in 1985
Alternative rock record labels
Indie rock record labels
Italian independent record labels
Companies based in Turin
Music in Turin
Italian companies established in 1985